Jerry N. Govan Jr. (born March 17, 1958) is an American politician. He is a former member of the South Carolina House of Representatives from the 95th District, serving since 1992. He is a member of the Democratic party. During his time as a legislator he chaired the South Carolina Legislative Black Caucus.

In 2022, after redistricting impacted his district, Govan announced his candidacy for state secretary of education rather than run for re-election. He faced Lisa Ellis and Gary Burgess in the Democratic primary. Govan did not advance to the general election. South Carolina House of Representatives District 95 is represented by Gilda Cobb-Hunter.

Electoral history

External Links

References

External links

South Carolina Resolution Commending Govan on his Meritorious Service

Living people
1958 births
Democratic Party members of the South Carolina House of Representatives
African-American state legislators in South Carolina
21st-century American politicians
21st-century African-American politicians
20th-century African-American people
South Carolina State University alumni
People from Orangeburg, South Carolina